Jay and Silent Bob Reboot is a 2019 American satirical buddy stoner comedy film written, directed, edited by, and starring Kevin Smith. Referring to his 2001 comedy Jay and Silent Bob Strike Back, Smith has described the film as a remake/reboot. It is the eighth film in the View Askewniverse. The film also stars Jason Mewes, and features cameos from Brian O'Halloran, Jason Lee, Justin Long, Shannon Elizabeth, Rosario Dawson, Val Kilmer, Melissa Benoist, Craig Robinson, Tommy Chong, Chris Hemsworth, Matt Damon, and Ben Affleck.

It was theatrically released with sessions around North America on October 15 and 17, 2019, and had the second highest per-screen average of 2019 (behind Parasite), thanks to its ongoing travelling roadshow. Jay and Silent Bob Reboot is the first movie to have per-screen averages over $60,000 four different times in its domestic run.

Plot
Jay and Silent Bob (Jason Mewes and Kevin Smith) lose a court case to Saban Films, who are making a new Bluntman and Chronic film, Bluntman V Chronic. They also unknowingly gave up naming rights, and can no longer call themselves "Jay and Silent Bob".

Jay and Bob visit Brodie Bruce (Jason Lee), who tells them about the Bluntman and Chronic reboot, directed by Kevin Smith. Largely completed, but a major scene is to be shot at the annual fan convention "Chronic-Con" in Hollywood. They have three days to get to Los Angeles to stop film completion and win back their identities, and so once again, they depart for California.

In an intermission, the fallen angel Loki (Matt Damon) then breaks the fourth wall to reveal that he was resurrected by God (Alanis Morissette) following Dogma, before revealing that in the time since, he was both the actor Matt Damon and the spy Jason Bourne in the twenty years since. Returning to the main plot, Jay and Bob first arrive in Chicago, where Jay sees his ex Justice (Shannon Elizabeth) is a local weathergirl. Jay and Bob visit Justice, who tells Jay he left her heartbroken by never visiting her in jail, which Jay attributes to the prison's lack of conjugal visits. She has since married Reggie (Rosario Dawson) and given birth to their love child, Millennium "Milly" Faulken (Harley Quinn Smith). Introducing Jay to their daughter and her best friend Sopapilla (Treshelle Edmond), but urges him to never tell her who he is.

Justice leaves for vacation, and Milly forces Jay to take her and Sopapilla to Hollywood with them. Drugging Jay and Bob with a strong edible, they wake up on a highway in New Orleans, where they meet Milly's two other friends, Jihad (Aparna Brielle) and Shan Yu (Alice Wen). Saying they want to go to Chronic-Con as Shan Yu is a huge fan of the first film and it is her dream to attend. Stealing a van, they drive to California. Milly blames her bad behavior on never knowing her dad.

Jay and Bob are abandoned by the group and set off in search of the van. They find it in a vacant area, where the Ku Klux Klan have kidnapped the girls and are having a rally. Bob steals a Klan hood and passes himself off as the new Grand Dragon to distract them while Jay rescues the girls. They throw a portable toilet at the Klansmen and flee. Jay, Bob, and the girls make it to Chronic-Con and sneak in. Jay and Bob plan to ruin the shoot, while the girls want to be extras to fulfill Shan Yu's dream. Agreeing to part ways, Jay hugs Milly and lets her know he is proud.

After attempting to sneak past a familiar security guard (Diedrich Bader), Jay and Bob are pursued throughout the con. They hide in an empty panel room where they are met by Holden McNeil (Ben Affleck), who has just finished recording a podcast with Alyssa Jones (Joey Lauren Adams). Holden donated his sperm to Alyssa and her wife (Virginia Smith) so they have a child, whom he helps co-parent. Holden tells Jay that fatherhood gave him a new purpose. This inspires Jay to abort the mission and be a father to Milly. Holden gives them VIP badges, which grants him and the girls access to the panel with Kevin Smith.

Noticing that Bob bears a resemblance to Smith, Milly sneaks backstage and knocks out Smith, giving Smith's clothes to Bob as a disguise. They bring Milly and Shan Yu on stage to film the scene, but Shan Yu realizes, knocks Bob unconscious, bringing out the real Kevin Smith. Shan Yu reveals herself to be a Russian spy, bent on destroying American pop culture conventions. Jay tells Milly he is her father. Bob regains consciousness outside and puts on a large metal "Iron Bob" suit that was to be used in the filming of the scene. Controlling the suit, Bob incites a riot at the panel and disarms Shan Yu and her henchmen.

After getting home, Jay shows Milly the Quick Stop and tells her the stories of his and Bob's adventures, including meeting Justice. Dante Hicks (Brian O'Halloran) arrives to open Quick Stop and bemoans the fact that the steel shutters are once again jammed closed.

In a post-credits scene, Jay tells Milly that for the past twenty-five years, he and Bob have been pranking Dante by jamming gum in the locks.

Cast

 Jason Mewes as Jay
 Kevin Smith as Silent Bob/Himself
 Harley Quinn Smith as Millennium "Milly" Faulken, Jay's estranged daughter, and a member of the girl gang
 Aparna Brielle as Jihad, a Muslim girl sent to the US by her mother; a member of the girl gang
 Shannon Elizabeth as Justice Faulken, Milly's mother and Reggie's wife
 Brian O'Halloran as Dante Hicks/Grant Hicks/Himself
 Jason Lee as Brodie Bruce
 Joey Lauren Adams as Alyssa Jones
 Jennifer Schwalbach Smith as Miss McKenzie, a Mooby's manager
 Treshelle Edmond as Sopapilla, a deaf member of the girl gang
 Alice Wen as Shan Yu, a Chinese girl and Bluntman and Chronic superfan; a member of the girl gang
 Craig Robinson as Judge Jerry N. Executioner
 Joe Manganiello as Bailiff
 Frankie Shaw as Prosecutor
 Justin Long as Brandon St. Randy, Jay and Silent Bob's and Saban Films' lawyer; Long reprises his role from Zack and Miri Make a Porno.
 Donnell Rawlings as SWAT Captain
 David Dastmalchian as SWAT Officer
 Chris Jericho as the KKK Grand Wizard
 Kate Micucci as Mary, a Mooby's employee
 Diedrich Bader as Gordon, a diligent security guard
 Melissa Benoist as Reboot Chronic
 Val Kilmer as Reboot Bluntman
 Tommy Chong as Alfred
 Ben Affleck as Holden McNeil
 Matt Damon as Loki, a fallen angel who was Jason Bourne
 Fred Armisen as Todd "Merkin" Merkinsky, a vehicle for hire driver
 Molly Shannon as Joline, an airline receptionist
 Ralph Garman as Ted Underhill, an arrogant businessman whose credit card information Jay and Silent Bob steal.
 Rosario Dawson as Reggie Faulken, Justice's wife
 Adam Brody as Chronic-Con Hot Topic salesman
 Dan Fogler as Chronic-Con line attendant

A number of Hollywood stars make cameos as themselves, including Jason Biggs and James Van Der Beek, similar to their appearance in Jay and Silent Bob Strike Back, Method Man and Redman in Jay and Silent Bob's hallucination, Chris Hemsworth via a holographic projection at Chronic-Con, Robert Kirkman during the credits, Keith Coogan, and Stan Lee, who makes a posthumous appearance in a mid-credits scene through the use of archive footage of himself and Smith taken from San Diego Comic-Con.

Brian O'Halloran, Marilyn Ghigliotti, Ernie O'Donnell, Scott Schiaffo, and John Willyung appear as themselves for a Clerks 25th Anniversary panel at Chronic-Con. Walt Flanagan, Bryan Johnson, Ming Chen, and Mike Zapcic appear as themselves during a Comic Book Men reunion panel. Actors Chris Wood, Jesse Rath, Ben Gleib, Impractical Jokers’ Brian Quinn and Fatman Beyond co-host Marc Bernardin appear as convention attendees.

In a mid-credits scene, Jake Richardson and Nick Fehlinger reprise their roles from Jay and Silent Bob Strike Back as the two young men that used to buy marijuana from Jay and Silent Bob.

Production
Following Clerks II, news has appeared often of other titles to be released in the View Askewniverse; these would include Clerks III and Mallrats 2. In 2017, Kevin Smith had confirmed that those projects were cancelled for several reasons, but revealed he had written a new film starring Jay and Silent Bob titled Jay and Silent Bob Reboot. The script was already finished when it was announced and it was said that Miramax would produce it. It was announced on January 25, 2019, that Saban Films had acquired U.S. and Canadian distribution rights to the film, with Universal Pictures Home Entertainment acquiring all international distribution rights. It is the first film in the View Askewniverse not to be produced by Scott Mosier, and the first film in the View Askewniverse since Mallrats not to be produced by Harvey and Bob Weinstein.

Filming
Filming was initially set to begin mid-2017, then moved to August 2018, then to November of that same year. After the various delays, filming finally began on February 25, 2019, in New Orleans exactly one year after Smith suffered a massive and near-fatal heart attack.

During the filming of the movie, Smith released a weekly documentary called Road to Reboot, showing what is being filmed that week. Production wrapped on March 27, 2019, after 21 days of shooting, which was the same number of days it took Smith to film his first movie, Clerks, 26 years earlier.

Casting
Mewes and Smith were attached to star as early as the film's announcement.

Comic book writer Stan Lee was initially cast as himself in the film in July 2017, but due to his death on November 12, 2018, was instead given a tribute within the film at Brodie Bruce's comics shop while additionally appearing in the mid-credits through archival footage. The film was also dedicated to his memory. The film's original third act was to revolve around Lee, with an extended performance from him as a main character; however, given principal photography on the film did not commence until three months after Lee's death, the entire third act of the script was rewritten and was based on an unused draft from Mallrats 2.

Ben Affleck was initially not involved in the film. When Affleck was asked in an interview if he got the call for Reboot, he said that "Your guess is as good as mine." After hearing about that interview, Smith reached out to Affleck and wrote in a scene for Affleck's character Holden McNeil from his 1997 film Chasing Amy.

Release

Theatrical
The film was released on October 15, 2019, as part of two night Fathom Events showings. The first showing on October 15 gave away a limited edition poster of the film, and the second on October 17 was a double feature with Jay and Silent Bob Strike Back.

The movie was released by Universal Pictures in the United Kingdom.

Roadshow
Following the Fathom showings, Smith embarked on a North American roadshow tour with a presentation of the film, followed by a Q&A session. The roadshow began on October 19 in Asbury Park, New Jersey and continued until February 26, 2020, in New Orleans, Louisiana. The tour expanded internationally near the beginning of 2020.

Home media
The film became available on Blu-ray, DVD, and streaming on January 21, 2020. The United States home media releases were distributed by Lionsgate Home Entertainment.

Reception
On review aggregator website Rotten Tomatoes, the film holds an approval rating of 64% based on  reviews, with an average of 6.30/10. The website's critical consensus reads: "Fan-focused to a fault, Jay & Silent Bob Reboot tries to mock the same audience nostalgia it's mining -- and pulls it off often enough to satisfy the faithful." On Metacritic, the film has a weighted average score of 46 out of 100, based on 7 critics, indicating "mixed or average reviews".

JoBlo.com's Paul Shirey gave the film an 8/10 and stated, "As comedy is so exceptionally subjective and this film so clearly tied to a somewhat niche appeal, I can only grade it as a fully biased fan of Smith, even if some of his flicks never worked for me, while others touched my cinematic nerve. As a fully Kevin Smith/Jay and Silent Bob comedy with a hefty amount of laughs and heart, this View Askew flick rates among his better works and cemented my resolve to happily revisit these wacky Jersey boys in another decade or so with pleasure."

Writing for The A.V. Club, Ignatiy Vishnevetsky called this installment "crude and lazy", giving it a D+ for crass humor and summing up the plot as "a succession of crudely drawn-out puns, painfully winking self-references, and underwhelming, listlessly directed cameos".

References

External links
 
 
 Jay and Silent Bob Reboot on Rotten Tomatoes

American black comedy films
American buddy comedy films
2010s buddy comedy films
American films about cannabis
2010s English-language films
Films about filmmaking
Films directed by Kevin Smith
Films scored by James L. Venable
Films set in New Jersey
Films set in San Diego
Films shot in New Orleans
Miramax films
Red Bank, New Jersey in fiction
View Askew Productions films
View Askewniverse films
Universal Pictures films
Lionsgate films
2010s American films